Butschliellaceae is a possible family of cryptomonads proposed by Pierre Bourrelly in 1970, to include both the previously described Butschiella and his newly discovered genus Skvortzoviella. Neither Butschiellaceae, nor its constituent genera, have been included in recent Cryptophyte phylogenies.

References 

Cryptomonads